The County of Stolberg-Rossla was a county of the Holy Roman Empire. Its capital was Rossla, now in Saxony-Anhalt, Germany. It was owned and ruled by a branch of the House of Stolberg from 1341 until 1803.

Stolberg-Rossla emerged as a partition of Stolberg-Stolberg in 1706. It was forced to recognize the suzerainty of the Electorate of Saxony in 1738. Stolberg-Rossla was mediatised to Saxony in 1803, but passed to the Kingdom of Prussia in 1815. Although the territory was subsequently administered within the Province of Saxony, the counts retained their possessions until 1945. In 1893 they were raised to the rank of  Princes of Stolberg-Rossla.

Rulers of Stolberg-Rossla

Counts of Stolberg-Rossla 

  Christoph Ludwig I, Count of Stolberg-Stolberg (1634–1704)
  Christoph Friedrich, Count of Stolberg-Stolberg (1672–1736)
  Jost Christian, 1st Count of Stolberg-Roßla 1706–1739 (1676–1739)
  Friedrich Botho, 2nd Count 1739–1768 (1714–1768)
 Heinrich Christian Friedrich, 3rd Count 1768–1778 (1747–1810)
 Johann Wilhelm Christoph, 4th Count 1778–1826 (1748–1826)
  August, 5th Count 1826–1846 (1768–1846)
  Karl Martin, 6th Count 1846–1870 (1822–1870)
  Botho, 7th Count 1870–1893 (1850–1893)

Princes of Stolberg-Rossla  

  Botho, 1st Prince 1893 (1850–1893)
 Jost Christian, 2nd Prince 1893–1916 (1886–1916)
  Christoph Martin, 3rd Prince 1916–1949 (1888–1949)
  Johann Martin, 4th Prince 1949–1982 (1917–1982)
   
Prince Alexander of Stolberg-Wernigerode (b.1967) was adopted by Stolberg-Roßla line. He has a son, Prince Ludwig (b.2008), and three daughters.

See also 
 House of Stolberg

References

1706 establishments in the Holy Roman Empire
1803 disestablishments in the Holy Roman Empire
States and territories established in 1706
Former states and territories of Saxony-Anhalt